Public sector undertakings in Kerala are of two types, public sector units in which majority shares are owned by Union Government and public sector units in which majority shares are owned by State Government. Public sector undertakings in Kerala, i.e. enterprises in which majority shareholder is Government of Kerala are generally divided into Manufacturing & Non-Manufacturing. Some of the PSUs such as Kinfra, KSIDC, SIDCO etc. are promotional agencies. As of 2004 there were 104 enterprises spread over 14 different sectors of Kerala economy. These sectors are as varied as engineering, electronics to wood products & welfare agencies. Eleven units are joint venture of Kerala government with the central government. Most of state PSUs units are under Department of Industries & Commerce (85 enterprises).

The largest enterprises (Based on 2005 figures)

Most of the PSUs in Kerala were loss making units until 2016.
The combined net profit made by all 40 State PSUs under the Industries Department was 110.41 crore in 2012–13. However, from 2013-14 onwards, the combined net profits of these State PSUs has been negative. It was (-)131.9 crore in 2015-16, and in 2016-17 financial year the loss reduced to Rs 80.67 crore. The financial year ending 2018 March the combined PSU net profit is of Rs 106.91 crore .

17 public sector units in the state had registered operational profit in the financial year 2018–19 with a total operating profit of Rs 330.36 crore and a net profit of Rs 258.29 crore.

The increased dependency on budgetary support even for continuing regular operations of PSUs was a major concern during the Twelfth Five-Year Plan. However, from the last year of the Twelfth Five-Year Plan (2016-17) onwards, major initiatives for strengthening and revamping of PSUs under the Industries Department are being undertaken. Five units namely Travancore Titanium Products Ltd., Travancore Cochin Chemicals Ltd., Traco Cable Company Ltd., Steel Industrial Forgings Ltd. and Transformers and Electricals Kerala Ltd. have seen a turn around in 2016–17. But in 2017–18, PSUs under Industries Department have made remarkable achievements. The combined net profit made by all 40 State PSUs as on 30th August, 2017 was 21.5 crore. It is notable that these PSUs have registered positive combined net profit after incurring net combined losses for 4 years.

State PSUs under the Industries department have been showing sign of improvement from 2016-17 onwards. Thirteen State PSUs under the Industries Department reported profits in 2016-17 as against only eight in 2015–16.

The number of loss-making State PSUs decreased from 32 in 2015-16 to 27 in 2016–17, and the total losses made by loss-making State PSUs during this period also decreased from 226.6 crore to 180.5 crore. 

Kerala Government have chosen to restructure the loss making units and not privatisation. 

"Kerala government should take a cue from the disinvestment process initiated at the Centre and initiate it at the State level" was a popular opinion held prior to 2016 . However the case seems to changing and now PSUs offer tremendous hope to Kerala .

List of state PSUs in Kerala

List of state PSUs in Kerala under joint ownership with Central Government

References

Government finances in Kerala
Kerala-related lists
 
Public sector in Kerala